Miss Ecuador 2019 was the 69th edition of the Miss Ecuador pageant. The Gala Finale was held on July 19, 2019. Virginia Limongi crowned her successor, Cristina Hidalgo from Guayaquil, at the end of the event. The winner represented Ecuador at Miss Universe 2019 pageant.

Results

Placements

Special Awards

Best National Costume

Contestants
The following are the list of official candidates of Miss Ecuador 2019:

Notes

Returns
Last compete in 2013

Last compete in 2014

Last compete in 2016

Withdrawals

Crossovers

Eliza Quiñónez was Reina de Esmeraldas 2016, Reina de la Província de Esmeraldas 2017, and 2nd Runner-up at Reina Mundial del Banano Ecuador 2018.
Ariana Abad was Reina de San Cristóbal 2018.
Sofía Freile competed at Miss Earth Ecuador 2017 where she finished as Miss Fire (3rd Runner-up).
Andreína González competed at Miss World Ecuador 2013 and Reina Internacional de la Ganadería 2015, but she was unplaced at both pageants. Also competed in Miss Latinoamerica 2016 where she finished  2nd Runner-Up
Sonia Luna was Reina de Guayaquil 2017; and she competed at Reina Internacional de la Ganadería 2017, but she was unplaced.
Andrea Burneo was Miss World Loja 2017, but she resigned before competing at Miss World Ecuador 2018.
Mishell Coppiano was Reina de Chone 2014 and 1st Runner-up (2nd Place) at Reina de Manabí 2014.
Vielka Cañarte competed at  Reina de Manta 2016, but she was unplaced.
Valeria Macías competed at Reina de Manta 2017 where she finished as Virreina (1st Runner-up).
Gabriela Cevallos was Reina de Catamayo 2012.
Susana Rivera competed at Miss World Ecuador 2015, but she was unplaced.
Mishell Vega competed at Reina de Santo Domingo 2018, but she was unplaced.

References

External links
Official Miss Ecuador website

2019 beauty pageants
Beauty pageants in Ecuador
Miss Ecuador